Yaseen Mahmoud Abdallah Al-Bakhit (Arabic: ياسين محمود عبد الله البخيت; born March 24, 1989) is a Jordanian footballer who plays as an attacking midfielder for the Jordan national football team.

International career
His first international match with the Jordan national team was against North Korea in a friendly, which resulted in a 1-1 draw, on 29 March 2011 in Sharjah, UAE when he entered as a substitute for his teammate Ahmad Abdel-Halim.

International goals
Scores and results list Jordan's goal tally first.

International career statistics

References

 kooora.com
 Jordanian Al-Bakhit On His Way to Al-Taawon FC (KSA)
 Yaseen Al-Bakhit from Al-Taawon FC to Al-Faisaly (KSA)
 Imprisonment for the Jordanian Professional Al-Bakhit
 Al-Faisaly (Harmah) Terminates the Contract of the Jordanian Al-Bakhit
 Al-Bakhit Leaves Prison on July 21st and Al-Yarmouk Hold a News Conference July 22nd
 Al-Bakhit Returns to Al-Faisaly (Harmah) for 170 Thousand Dollars 
 Al-Bakhit Signs Up for Ettifaq FC (KSA) for 350 Thousand Dollars
 Signs Up for Hatta (UAE)
 Al-Bakhit Signs Up for Dibba Al-Fujairah (UAE)

External links 
 
 
 

1989 births
Living people
Sportspeople from Amman
Jordanian footballers
Jordan international footballers
Association football midfielders
Al-Yarmouk FC (Jordan) players
Al-Taawoun FC players
Al-Faisaly FC players
Ettifaq FC players
Al-Shoulla FC players
Al-Faisaly SC players
Hatta Club players
Dibba FC players
Al-Ittihad Kalba SC players
Al Dhafra FC players
Emirates Club players
Umm Salal SC players
Jordanian Pro League players
Saudi Professional League players
UAE Pro League players
UAE First Division League players
2019 AFC Asian Cup players
Jordanian expatriate footballers
Expatriate footballers in Saudi Arabia
Expatriate footballers in the United Arab Emirates
Expatriate footballers in Qatar
Jordanian expatriate sportspeople in Saudi Arabia
Jordanian expatriate sportspeople in the United Arab Emirates
Jordanian expatriate sportspeople in Qatar